Bloodfist VI: Ground Zero is a 1995 American action film directed by Rick Jacobson and starring Don Wilson, Marcus Aurelius, Michael Blanks, and Anthony Boyer. It was written by Brendan Broderick and Rob Kerchner.

Premise
Air Force courier Nick Corrigan is sent to deliver a message to a nuclear missile base in a remote corner of the Midwest. Unbeknownst to him, however, a gang of terrorists have taken over the base in the hopes of launching the missiles at all of the nation's largest cities. In a panic, they lock Nick in the base, thinking to keep him from interfering with their plans. Little do they know, however, that Sgt. Corrigan is a former Special Forces soldier who is more than capable of shutting them down single-handedly.

Criticism
Jack Shaheen lists Bloodfist VI: Ground Zero as one of the most Anti-Arabist films produced by the United States film industry.

References

External links
 

1995 films
1990s action films
American independent films
American martial arts films
American action films
Kickboxing films
Direct-to-video sequel films
American sequel films
Bloodfist films
1990s English-language films
Films directed by Rick Jacobson
1990s American films